Anat is a Semitic goddess and a Hebrew female given name. ANAT or Anat may refer to:

People
Anat Biletzki (born 1952), Israeli philosophy professor
Anat Brunstein Klomek, Israeli psychologist 
Anat Draigor (born 1960), basketball player
Anat Fabrikant (born 1975), Israeli Olympic competitive sailor
Anat Fort (born 1970), Israeli musician
Anat Lelior (born 2000), Israeli surfer
Anat Maor (born 1945), Israeli politician
Anat Peleg (born 1957), Israeli author
Anat Zamir (1962–2018), Israeli model and actress
Anat Zuria (born 1961), Israeli film director

Organizations
 ANAT Technology, Articulated Nimble Adaptable Trunk
 Australian Network for Art and Technology

See also

Ant (name)
 Annat (disambiguation)